Caladenia amnicola, commonly known as the Bundarra spider orchid is a plant in the orchid family Orchidaceae and is endemic to a small area in New South Wales. It has a single leaf and usually only one greenish-yellow flower with red markings and is only known from a single population.

Description
The mid-line of the labellum has four to six rows of crowded reddish calli. Flowering occurs from November to January.

Taxonomy and naming
The specific epithet (amnicola) is a Latin word meaning "inhabitant of or by a river".

Distribution and habitat
Bundarra spider orchid is only known from a single population at the type location. It grows in a layer of dense, low shrubs near a forest stream.

Conservation
Caladenia amnicola is listed as "2KV" in the ROTAP classification meaning that it is vulnerable and poorly known from a restricted distribution.

References

amnicola
Plants described in 1999
Endemic orchids of Australia
Orchids of New South Wales
Taxa named by David L. Jones (botanist)